Chroodactylon is a genus of red algae belonging to the family Stylonemataceae.

Species:

Chroodactylon depressum 
Chroodactylon filamentosum 
Chroodactylon ornatum 
Chroodactylon ramosum 
Chroodactylon wolleanum

References

Stylonematophyceae
Red algae genera